Patari is a scheduled tribe in Uttar Pradesh, India.

Patari may also refer to:
 Patari (service), music streaming service in Pakistan
 Patari Union, a union council of Bangladesh